The 2011–12 Perth Heat season will be the second season for the team. As was the case for the previous season, the Heat will compete in the Australian Baseball League (ABL) with the other five foundation teams, and will again play its home games at Barbagallo Ballpark.

The Heat will also be defending the ABL Championship title, having won the previous season's Championship Series, and over the course of the season, will represent Australia in the 2011 Asia Series.

Offseason 
Following the Heat's inaugural ABL Championship victory, the League announced that, beginning in 2011, the winner of each ABL Championship Series would participate in that year's Asia Series, a round-robin tournament of champion teams from the baseball leagues of Asia, including representatives of Japan, Republic of Korea, Republic of China and, going forward, People's Republic of China. As winners of the 2011 ABL Championship Series, the Heat will be the first Australian team to enter into this competition.

Regular season

Standings

Record vs opponents

Game log 

|- bgcolor=#bbbbbb
| —
| 3 November
| colspan=7 | Postponed due to rain (5 November)
| 
|- bgcolor=#bbffbb
| 1
| 4 November
| 
| W 6–1
| Cameron Lamb (1–0)
| Dushan Ruzic (0–1)
| 
| 958
| 1–0
| 
|- bgcolor=#bbbbbb
| —
| 5 November
| colspan=7 | Postponed due to rain (6 November)
| 
|- bgcolor=#bbbbbb
| —
| 5 November
| colspan=7 | Postponed due to rain (TBA)
| 
|- bgcolor=#bbffbb
| 2
| 6 November (DH 1)
| 
| W 7–4
| Geoff Brown (1–0)
| Chris Lawson (0–1)
| Benn Grice (1)
| —
| 2–0
| 
|- bgcolor=#bbffbb
| 3
| 6 November (DH 2)
| 
| W 3–2
| Benn Grice (1–0)
| Wayne Ough (0–1)
| 
| 952
| 3–0
| 
|- bgcolor=#bbffbb
| 4
| 11 November
| @ 
| W 6–3
| Daniel Schmidt (1–0)
| Shane Lindsay (0–1)
| Benn Grice (2)
| 1,514
| 4–0
| 
|- bgcolor=#bbffbb
| 5
| 12 November
| @ 
| W 9–8
| Trevor Caughey (1–0)
| Yusei Kikuchi (0–1)
| Matt Erikson (1)
| 1,174
| 5–0
| 
|- bgcolor=#bbffbb
| 6
| 13 November (DH 1)
| @ 
| W 6–1
| Jacob Clem (1–0)
| Jason Hirsh (0–1)
| 
| —
| 6–0
| 
|- bgcolor=#bbffbb
| 7
| 13 November (DH 2)
| @ 
| W 5–3
| Warwick Saupold (1–0)
| Nic Ungs (0–1)
| 
| 923
| 7–0
| 
|-
| 8
| 17 November
| @ 
| –
| 
| 
| 
| 
| 
| 
|-
| 9
| 18 November (DH 1)
| @ 
| –
| 
| 
| 
| 
| 
| 
|-
| 10
| 18 November (DH 2)
| @ 
| –
| 
| 
| 
| 
| 
| 
|-
| 11
| 19 November
| @ 
| –
| 
| 
| 
| 
| 
| 
|-
| colspan=10 | 2011 Asia Series
|-

|-
| 12
| 2 December
| 
| –
| 
| 
| 
| 
| 
| 
|-
| 13
| 3 December
| 
| –
| 
| 
| 
| 
| 
| 
|-
| 14
| 4 December
| 
| –
| 
| 
| 
| 
| 
| 
|-
| 15
| 5 December
| 
| –
| 
| 
| 
| 
| 
| 
|-
| 16
| 8 December
| @ 
| –
| 
| 
| 
| 
| 
| 
|-
| 17
| 9 December
| @ 
| –
| 
| 
| 
| 
| 
| 
|-
| 18
| 10 December (DH 1)
| @ 
| –
| 
| 
| 
| 
| 
| 
|-
| 19
| 10 December (DH 2)
| @ 
| –
| 
| 
| 
| 
| 
| 
|-
| 20
| 16 December
| 
| –
| 
| 
| 
| 
| 
| 
|-
| 21
| 17 December
| 
| –
| 
| 
| 
| 
| 
| 
|-
| 22
| 18 December
| 
| –
| 
| 
| 
| 
| 
| 
|-
| 23
| 19 December
| 
| –
| 
| 
| 
| 
| 
| 
|-
| 24
| 20 December
| 
| –
| 
| 
| 
| 
| 
| 
|-
| 25
| 29 December
| @ 
| –
| 
| 
| 
| 
| 
| 
|-
| 26
| 30 December
| @ 
| –
| 
| 
| 
| 
| 
| 
|-
| 27
| 31 December (DH 1)
| @ 
| –
| 
| 
| 
| 
| 
| 
|-
| 28
| 31 December (DH 2)
| @ 
| –
| 
| 
| 
| 
| 
| 
|-

|-
| 29
| 1 January
| @ 
| –
| 
| 
| 
| 
| 
| 
|-
| 30
| 4 January
| 
| –
| 
| 
| 
| 
| 
| 
|-
| 31
| 5 January
| 
| –
| 
| 
| 
| 
| 
| 
|-
| 32
| 6 January
| 
| –
| 
| 
| 
| 
| 
| 
|-
| 33
| 7 January
| 
| –
| 
| 
| 
| 
| 
| 
|-
| 34
| 8 January
| 
| –
| 
| 
| 
| 
| 
| 
|-
| 35
| 12 January
| @ 
| –
| 
| 
| 
| 
| 
| 
|-
| 36
| 13 January
| @ 
| –
| 
| 
| 
| 
| 
| 
|-
| 37
| 14 January  (DH 1)
| @ 
| –
| 
| 
| 
| 
| 
| 
|-
| 38
| 14 January  (DH 2)
| @ 
| –
| 
| 
| 
| 
| 
| 
|-
| 39
| 15 January
| @ 
| –
| 
| 
| 
| 
| 
| 
|-
| 40
| 18 January
| 
| –
| 
| 
| 
| 
| 
| 
|-
| 41
| 19 January
| 
| –
| 
| 
| 
| 
| 
| 
|-
| 42
| 20 January
| 
| –
| 
| 
| 
| 
| 
| 
|-
| 43
| 21 January
| 
| –
| 
| 
| 
| 
| 
| 
|-
| 44
| 22 January
| 
| –
| 
| 
| 
| 
| 
| 
|-

Roster

References 

Perth Heat
Perth Heat